Cannabielsoin (CBE) is a metabolite of cannabidiol, one of the major chemical components of cannabis.

History 
Cannabielsoin in scientific journals was first cited in 1973. It was concluded that cannabielsoin was formed from cannabidiol as part of the metabolic process and is non-psychoactive.

See also 
 Cannabicitran
 Cannabicyclol
 Cannabimovone
 Cannabitriol

References 

Cannabis
Dibenzofurans
Isopropenyl compounds
Phenols
Tertiary alcohols
Human drug metabolites
Phytocannabinoids